Flight 38 may refer to:
Braniff Flight 38, hijacked on 12 January 1972
British Airways Flight 38, accident on 17 January 2008

0038